The Gruesome Book is a novel anthology edited by Ramsey Campbell published in 1983.

Plot summary
The Gruesome Book is a collection of nine stories for children.

Reception
Dave Langford reviewed The Gruesome Book for White Dwarf #42, and stated that "To dismiss all children's titles as immature or 'just for kids' is to be in danger of missing good books."

Reviews
Review by Karl Edward Wagner (1983) in Rod Serling's The Twilight Zone Magazine, November-December 1983

References

1983 novels